The Border Service of the National Security Committee of the Republic of Kazakhstan is a governmental paramilitary force that manages the international borders of Kazakhstan. August 18 is celebrated as the Day of the Border Troops, which is the professional holiday of the Border service.

History
On August 18, 1992, in accordance with the Law “On State Independence of the Republic of Kazakhstan” and in coordination with the newly formed Commonwealth of Independent States (CIS), President Nursultan Nazarbayev ordered the establishment of the border troops from a compound of the Eastern Border District of the KGB of the USSR. In accordance with the intergovernmental treaties on collective security in May 1992, the Parliament of Kazakhstan adopted a Decree on consolidating a Kazakhstani battalion to strengthen the external borders of the CIS in December of that same year. The border troops developed a military council in April 1993 and had begun to incorporate maritime elements into the service a couple of days before the Victory Day holiday on May 9. The maritime units were located at the seaport of Aktau in the Mangystau region was determined to be the location of all sea units of the border guards. In 1994, combat activities of the Border troops were carried out for the first time against the background of positive development of interstate relations based on an agreement on the Kazakh-Chinese Border signed in May 1994.

In order to improve the protection of the Kazakh border, President Nazarbayev in May 1995 converted the Border troops into an independent government agency called the State Committee of the Republic of Kazakhstan, of which Major General Bolat Zakiev was appointed as chairman. 
By decree of the President dated November 17, 1997, the Border Troops were reformed into the Security Forces of the Ministry of Defense. In the early 2000s, regional commands were formed to ensure the protection of the border of Kazakhstan, irrespective of the region. In 2011, it was decided to reform the border department of Kazakhstan in order to maximize its adaptation to the modern era, transferring its mission of the administrative protection of the border to an operational component. In 2012, August 18 was officially declared as the Day of the Border Guard, replacing the Border Guards Day holiday on May 28.

Timeline of border agreements
July 17, 1997 – President Nazarbayev and Kyrgyz President Askar Akaev signed a memorandum on the delimitation of the State border between Kazakhstan and Kyrgyzstan in Cholpon-Ata.
 July 1998 – The process of delimitation of the border between Kazakhstan and China was completed.
January 2000 – Nazarbayev and Chinese President Jiang Zemin signed a joint communiqué on the full settlement of border issues between the Kazakhstan and the China.
 May 2002 – A protocol on the demarcation of the Kazakhstan-China border was signed between Kazakhstan and China.
 January 18, 2005 – Nazarbayev and President Vladimir Putin of Russia signed a treaty on the Russo-Kazakh border, which defined the line of passage of the longest continuous land border in the world.
 2008 – The demarcation of the border with Turkmenistan and Uzbekistan was completed.

State Symbols
The border guard service was awarded the honor of having official state symbols on November 20, 1996 by decree of President Nazarbayev. The entire service sports its own flag and seal, the latter of which consists of a blue star on a green circle with a yellow bird (similar to the one seen on the Kazakh flag) located at the under the circle. The naval components of the border service also maintain their own naval jacks and ensigns, which are flown on top of ships and vessels of the border guard.

Structure

 Central Office of the Border Guard Service
 Border units 
 Border Commandants
 Border Posts
 Border Checkpoints
 Air Police
 Coast Guard
 Support units
 Specialized military schools

Regional Directorates
Regional Directorate "West"
Regional Directorate "South" 
Regional Directorate "Vostok" 
Regional Directorate "North" 
Regional Coast Guard Directorate — Guards Kazakhstan's maritime border in the Caspian Sea.

Academy 
The Academy of the Border Service of the National Security Committee ( / ) is the official military institution of the border service. It was founded by the Soviet Government on December 26, 1931 and was put under the control of the Joint State Political Directorate. In April 1957, the school was put under the authority and jurisdiction of the Committee for State Security (KGB) and was later transformed into a four-year school, which would be based in Alma-Ata (now Almaty). It was reformed in 1993, as the Military Institute of the NSC which it would hold until it was given its current name in 2012.

Tasks
Primary tasks of the Border Service include:

 Creating a border policy 
 Enhancing border security
 Protecting the Kazakh border with Russia, China, Kyrgyzstan, Uzbekistan, and Turkmenistan, as well as a large portion of the Caspian Sea
 Preventing and suppress encroachments on the territorial integrity of Kazakhstan
 Fulfilling international obligations in relation to the international borders
 Participating in the defense of the Republic of Kazakhstan from the national border
 Assisting law enforcement and environmental authorities in the protection of citizens and natural resources on the border

Directors
 Lieutenant General Evgeny Neverovsky (August 1992 – October 1992)
 Lieutenant General Bolat Zakiev (October 1992 – June 1997)
 Major General Toktasyn Buzubayev (June 1997 – July 1999) 
 Lieutenant General Bolat Zakiev (July 1999 – May 2008)
 Major General Bolat Kirgizbaev (May 2008 – February 2011) 
 Major General Nurzhan Myrzaliev (February 2011 – June 2012)
 Lieutenant General Nurlan Dzhulamanov (January 15, 2013 – October 27, 2014) 
 Major General Darkhan Dilmanov (October 27, 2014 – April 5, 2022)
 Major General Yerlan Aldazhumanov (Since May 23, 2022)

Awards
In accordance with a decree of President Nazarbayev on September 30, 2011, the following state awards for the service were established:

See also

 Armed Forces of Kazakhstan
 Ministry of Defense (Kazakhstan)
 National Security Committee of the Republic of Kazakhstan
 Visa policy of Kazakhstan

References

Kazakhstan
Service
Government of Kazakhstan
Government paramilitary forces
Military of Kazakhstan